Ramani Elizabeth Bartholomeusz (1 September 1966 – 30 June 1987) was a Sri Lankan model and actress. Having been crowned Miss Sri Lanka in 1985, she represented Sri Lanka at the 1985 Miss Universe pageant.

Personal life
Ramani was born to Kamala and Leslie Mark Bartholomeusz in Gampaha. Her father Leslie too was a well known documentary film director, broadcaster, journalist and author. She has three sisters, Marie Bartholomeusz, Dileene Bartholomeusz, Reneira Bartholomeusz and one brother Mark Bartholomeusz. She completed her education at Holy Cross College, Gampaha.

Acting career
at the age of 16, she was screened in Lester James Peiris's 1983 film Yuganthaya (English title: End of an Era) in the role of Chamari, alongside renowned actor Gamini Fonseka. After her appearance at the 1985 Miss Universe contest, Bartholomeusz continued in the acting field appearing in Dharmasiri Bandaranayake's Makarakshaya and pairing with Kamal Addararachchi in Himakumari.

Some of her most popular television acting came through Bhagya, where she co-acted with Ranjan Ramanayake. She was widely popularized with the song Aji Thapara Lahila sung by Deepika Priyadarshani. Then she made main roles in Irata Hadana Mal, Himakumari, Salalihini Gammanaya. She also appeared in the musical program Hada Bandi Gee telecasted by Rupavahini.

Death
Bartholomeusz died on June 30, 1987 at the age of 20 when she was allegedly pushed out of the car while Kamal Addararachchi was driving it after a dispute. Exact details are unknown.

Legacy
21 years after her death Bartholomeusz was the cover feature for the 1st issue of Reel and Track Magazine

References

External links
Ramani Bartholomeusz in Sri Lanka Cinema Database
The Sunday Times: Article by Ramesh Uvais

අමතක නැහැ

	

1966 births
1987 deaths
20th-century Sri Lankan actresses
Burgher models
Miss Universe 1985 contestants
People murdered in Sri Lanka
Sri Lankan beauty pageant winners
Sri Lankan film actresses
Sri Lankan murder victims